Jan Schoemaker  ( – ) was a Dutch footballer. He was part of the Netherlands national football team, playing 2 matches. He played his first match on 29 April 1906.

See also
 List of Dutch international footballers

References

1882 births
1954 deaths
Dutch footballers
Netherlands international footballers
Footballers from The Hague
Association footballers not categorized by position